Brigham and Women's Hospital (BWH) is the second largest teaching hospital of Harvard Medical School and the largest hospital in the Longwood Medical Area in Boston, Massachusetts. Along with Massachusetts General Hospital, it is one of the two founding members of Mass General Brigham, the largest healthcare provider in Massachusetts. Robert Higgins, MD, MSHA serves as the hospital's current president.

Brigham and Women's Hospital conducts the second largest (behind MGH) hospital-based research program in the world, with an annual research budget of more than $630 million. Pioneering achievements at BWH have included the world's first successful heart valve operation and the world's first solid organ transplant.

In the 2020 U.S. News & World Report hospital rankings, BWH was ranked second in Massachusetts (behind MGH) and twelfth nationally.

History

Brigham and Women's Hospital was established with the 1980 merger of three Harvard-affiliated hospitals: Peter Bent Brigham Hospital (established in 1913); Robert Breck Brigham Hospital (established in 1914); and Boston Hospital for Women (established in 1966 as a merger of Boston Lying-In Hospital, established in 1832, and Free Hospital for Women, established in 1875).

In 1954, the Peter Bent Brigham Hospital became the location for the first-ever successful kidney transplant, performed on identical twins, Ronald Hendrick (the donor) and Richard Hendrick (the recipient). J. Hartwell Harrison, Chief of the Urology Department, operated on the donor, and Joseph Murray was the surgeon for the recipient. Murray later received a Nobel Prize for this and other work. Dr. Samuel A. Levine introduced the arm-chair treatment of myocardial infarction in the 1950s and his protégé Dr. Bernard Lown was an early innovator in the development of the coronary care unit in the 1960s.

After a 10-year affiliation with Faulkner Hospital in the Jamaica Plain section of Boston, BWH merged with the community hospital in 2012 to form Brigham and Women's Faulkner Hospital.

In April 2017, Brigham and Women's announced they would be offering voluntary buyouts to 1,600 staff in an effort to control costs.  The hospital was profitable, but this move was due to higher labor and other costs amid stagnant payments from insurance companies. The hospital also needs to pay for two large projects, a $550 million new outpatient and research building that opened the previous year and a $335 million new software system launched in 2015.

Also in April 2017, the United States District Court for the District of Massachusetts announced that Brigham and Women's Hospital and its nonprofit hospital and physicians network, Partners HealthCare, agreed to pay a $10 million fine to resolve allegations that a stem cell research lab fraudulently obtained federal grant funding.

After 11 years as the president of Brigham and Women's Hospital, Dr. Elizabeth Nabel, will step down to pursue opportunities in the for-profit biotech sector. She will leave the  position as of March 1, 2021 and join a biotech firm co-founded by her husband Gary Nabel and Elias Zerhouni.

In the late 2010s, Brigham Health contracted with Evergrande to provide medical training and consulting to set up the private Boao Evergrande International Hospital in China for patients who could afford to pay. The venture struggled due to lack of patients; the contract was allowed to lapse and Brigham branding was removed by mid-2021. The relatively remote location of Boao compared to population centers of wealthy Chinese was blamed for the failure.

Core service lines
 Dana-Farber/ Brigham and Women's Cancer Center: The center brings together a cancer institute and a hospital, creating 13 specialized disease centers.
 Carl J. and Ruth Shapiro Cardiovascular Center.
 Brigham and Women's Orthopedic and Arthritis Center: They specialize in research and therapies for bone and joint disease and injury.
 Brigham and Women's Neurosciences Institute: The BWH Neurosciences Institute offers treatments for all nervous system diseases. The institute integrates neurology, neurosurgery, psychiatry and neuroradiology, with advanced research and clinical trials.
 Mary Horrigan Connors Center for Women's Health: BWH specializes in high-risk obstetric care, newborn intensive care, infertility services, complex gynecologic surgery, and gender-specific care.
 Osher Center for Integrative Medicine including chiropractic care.

Quality and safety
In the early 1990s, BWH pioneered Computerized Physician Order Entry (CPOE) to prevent medication errors. BWH has received patient safety awards for its electronic Medication Administration Record (eMAR) and barcoding system, which places barcodes on patients' medications, name bands, and nurses' badges. A nurse scans all three barcodes before administering a medication to ensure that each patient receives the correct medication and dosage at the correct time.

The orthopedic surgery department focused on patients' satisfaction for those who received knee and hip replacements. Leaders in the department included John Wright, Mary Anne Kenyon, and Carolyn Beagan, but they gave little attention to holding costs down.

Research
In 2013, the BWH Biomedical Research Institute (BRI) received $630 million in research support from all sources. For over a decade, it has been one of the two hospitals receiving the most National Institutes of Health (NIH) funding among independent hospitals in the United States.  It employs over 3,300 researchers.

BRI has worked on regenerative medicine, designing nanoparticles to attack different cancer types and starting a clinical trial for a type of Alzheimer's disease vaccine. BWH research also includes population studies including the Nurses' Health Study and Physicians' Health Study.

The 21st century has seen dramatic shifts in the diagnostic and therapeutic approach to lung carcinomas, beginning with the discovery of epidermal growth factor receptor (EGFR) mutations and their role in directing management with targeted tyrosine kinase inhibitors. Since 2003, this has reshaped the approach at BWH's molecular diagnostic testing center.

In 2017, the hospital began the first human clinical trials to reverse the aging process using NAD. The trials are headed by biologist David Andrew Sinclair.

In 2019, BWH opened the Brigham Preventive Genomics Clinic, becoming one of the first hospitals in the United States to offer DNA sequencing, reporting, and interpretation of disease-associated genes to healthy patients seeking to reduce their risk of future disease.

References

External links
 Official Brigham and Women's Hospital website
 Boston Hospital for Women Records, 1926–1983 (inclusive), 1966–1979 (bulk). BWH c5. Harvard Medical Library, Francis A. Countway Library of Medicine, Boston, Mass.
 Brigham and Women’s Hospital records, 1913– (inclusive), 1980–2000 (bulk). BWH c1. Harvard Medical Library, Francis A. Countway Library of Medicine, Boston, Mass.
 Boston Lying-in Hospital records, 1855-1986 (inclusive), 1921–1966 (bulk). BWH c7. Harvard Medical Library, Francis A. Countway Library of Medicine, Boston, Mass.
 Free Hospital for Women records, 1875–1975. BWH c6. Harvard Medical Library, Francis A. Countway Library of Medicine, Boston, Mass.
 Affiliated Hospitals Center records, 1966–1984. BWH c2. Harvard Medical Library, Francis A. Countway Library of Medicine, Boston, Mass.
 Peter Bent Brigham Hospital Records, 1830– (inclusive), 1911–1980 (bulk). BWH c3. Harvard Medical Library, Francis A. Countway Library of Medicine, Boston, Mass.
 Robert B. Brigham Hospital. Records, 1889–1984 (inclusive), 1915–1980,(bulk). BWH c4. Harvard Medical Library, Francis A. Countway Library of Medicine, Boston, Mass.

Teaching hospitals in Massachusetts
Hospitals in Boston
Harvard Medical School
Hospitals established in 1980
Roxbury, Boston
Trauma centers